Tyler Stockton is an American college football coach and former player who serves as the assistant head coach, defensive coordinator and inside linebackers coach at Ball State University. He spent four years on the Notre Dame Fighting Irish football team, where he played part of one season as a defensive lineman. He spent time coaching at the University of Connecticut and Western Illinois University before arriving at Ball State.

Playing career
Stockton was rated as a four-star recruit by 247Sports and was the top-rated commit in the class of 2009 in New Jersey. ESPN rated him as the third-best defensive tackle in the nation. Raised in Linwood, New Jersey, he played his high school football at the Hun School of Princeton, located in Princeton, New Jersey. He was named to the all-state first team by the Newark Star-Ledger following his junior year. On April 19, 2008, Stockton committed to Notre Dame, picking the Fighting Irish over other offers from California, North Carolina, Penn State, Pittsburgh, Rutgers, Tennessee, UCLA, USC, Vanderbilt. He took an official visit to South Bend on October 31 of that year and formally enrolled early on June 30, 2009. He was one of three players to enroll early at Notre Dame at the time, alongside E.J. Banks and Zeke Motta. Additionally, he competed in the 2009 All-American Bowl.

Stockton saw limited action during his four years on the team at Notre Dame. He played in only six games throughout his college career, all of which were during his sophomore year, though he did not start any of them. The lone tackle he recorded at Notre Dame was a four-yard sack on October 2, 2010, against Boston College. Stockton did not see playing time during his freshman, junior, or senior seasons.

Coaching career
Stockton took his first coaching position when he was hired as a graduate assistant at UConn in 2014, working under new head coach Bob Diaco, who had been his defensive coordinator at Notre Dame. He remained at UConn for two seasons. Stockton moved to Western Illinois in 2016 as the Leathernecks' defensive line coach and run game coordinator. After two seasons in those positions, he was promoted to defensive coordinator and outside linebackers coach before the 2018 season. He was hired by Mike Neu at Ball State as the Cardinals' defensive coordinator and inside linebackers coach, a position he has held since 2019.

In December 2020, Stockton was revealed to be one of 56 nominees for the Broyles Award, awarded annually to the top assistant coach in college football. He was nominated for a second time in November 2021, this time alongside 57 other assistants. Stockton was the second-youngest FBS defensive coordinator at the time of each of his nominations.

After Randy Edsall retired as UConn head coach in September 2021, Stockton was mentioned by some as a potential replacement, though Jim L. Mora was ultimately selected.

Personal life
Stockton is the son of Naomi and Lyndon Stockton. He graduated from the Mendoza College of Business at the University of Notre Dame with a Bachelor of Business Administration in marketing in 2013, and earned a Master of Business Administration in corporate finance from Notre Dame the following year.

References

Living people
Notre Dame Fighting Irish football players
UConn Huskies football coaches
Western Illinois Leathernecks football coaches
Ball State Cardinals football coaches
Hun School of Princeton alumni
People from Linwood, New Jersey
Players of American football from New Jersey
Sportspeople from Atlantic County, New Jersey
Coaches of American football from New Jersey
20th-century American people
21st-century American people
Year of birth missing (living people)